18O or variant, may refer to:

 Oxygen 18 (18O), an isotope of oxygen with atomic mass number 18 (8 protons + 10 neutrons)
 2019 Catalan general strike (18-O)
 18º, a way to write the ordinal number 18th (eighteenth)

See also

 δ18O
 
 
 O-18 (disambiguation) and O18
 18 (disambiguation)
 O (disambiguation)
 180 (disambiguation) (one-eight-zero; 180)
 I80 (disambiguation) (i-eight-zero; I80)
 l80 (disambiguation) (L-eight-zero; l80)